This is a list of seasons played by Heart of Midlothian F.C. in both Scottish and European football, from when the club first entered the Scottish Cup in 1875 to the present day. It details the club's achievements in major competitions for each season, as well as giving the top goalscorer and average attendance by supporters.

Note: The Top Goalscorer column includes goals scored in all competitions whereas the Average Attendance column only includes the figures given for home league matches.

Seasons

Notes

References

Results and achievements: London Hearts – Results by Season
Top goalscorers: Rec Sport Soccer Statistics Foundation – List of Topscorers
Attendance figures: 

Seasons
 
Heart of Midlothian
Seasons